BNS Tallashi  is a hydrographic survey ship of the Bangladesh Navy. She was commissioned on 5 November 2020.

See also
 BNS Darshak
 Khulna Shipyard Limited
 List of active ships of the Bangladesh Navy

References

Ships of the Bangladesh Navy
Research vessels of Bangladesh
2019 ships
Ships built at Khulna Shipyard